Deepa Venkat is a Tamil film and television actress. Besides being an actress, she is also a popular dubbing artist and a radio disc jockey at Hello FM Chennai. She has played leading roles in over 80 television serials and a few Tamil movies. She has dubbed for various famous actresses such as Simran, Sneha, Jyothika, Nayanthara, Anushka Shetty, Kajal Aggarwal, Aishwarya Rai Bachchan & other actresses in various films. She was given a Kalaimamani award by the Government of Tamil Nadu.

Career 
Deepa made her acting career with the movie Paasamalargal, along with  Arvind Swamy, Revathi, Srividya, M. N. Nambiar, and Chinni Jayanth in 1994. She played Jhanvi, in a supporting child artist role.
She started her dubbing career in the movie Appu for Devayani which was successful an box office hit.She has dubbed for various actresses in Tamil movie industry.

Awards 

 2012: Won Norway Tamil Film Festival Award for Best Dubbing Artist for Mayakkam Enna
 2012: Nominated, BIG Salute to Tamil Women Entertainer Award for Best Dubbing Artist
2019: Won JFW Awards for Best Dubbing Artist for Imaikkaa Nodigal (for Nayanthara).
2020: Won JFW Awards for Best Dubbing Artist for Game Over (for Taapsee Pannu).

Filmography

Dubbing

As an actress
Films
 All films are in Tamil language, Otherwise noted.

Television

References

External links
 
 
 
 

Tamil television actresses
Indian voice actresses
Actresses in Tamil cinema
Living people
Indian radio presenters
Recipients of the Kalaimamani Award
Actresses from Chennai
21st-century Indian actresses
Indian women radio presenters
20th-century Indian actresses
Indian television actresses
Actresses in Telugu cinema
Child actresses in Tamil cinema
Indian child actresses
Year of birth missing (living people)